John McGowan (1894–1977) was an American librettist, director and producer.

Selected credits

Say When, Producer and Book
Pardon My English, Book Director
Earl Carroll's Vanities of 1932, Book
Heigh-ho, Everybody, Writer
Singin' the Blues, Writer
Girl Crazy, Book
Flying High, Book
Nigger Rich (The Big Shot), Writer and Director
Murray Anderson's Almanac, Book
The Lady Lies, Producer
Hold Everything!, Book
Excess Baggage, Writer
Tenth Avenue, Writer

References

1894 births
1977 deaths
American librettists
American theatre directors
American theatre managers and producers
20th-century American dramatists and playwrights